Sphaerodactylus thompsoni, also known commonly as Thompson's least gecko or the Barahona limestone geckolet, is a small species of lizard in the family Sphaerodactylidae. The species is endemic to Hispaniola.

Etymology
The specific name, thompsoni, is in honor of American malacologist Fred Gilbert Thompson (1934–2016), collector of the holotype.

Geographic range
S. thompsoni is found in the Dominican Republic and Haiti.

Habitat

Description

Reproduction
S. thompsoni is oviparous.

References

Further reading
Rösler H (2000). "Kommentierte Liste der rezent, subrezent und fossil bekannten Geckotaxa (Reptilia: Gekkonomorpha)". Gekkota 2: 28–153. (Sphaerodactylus thompsoni, p. 114). (in German).
Schwartz A, Franz R (1976). "A new species of Sphaerodactylus (Sauria: Gekkonidae) from Hispaniola". Proceedings of the Biological Society of Washington 88: 367–372. (Sphaerodactylus thompsoni, new species).
Schwartz A, Henderson RW (1991). Amphibians and Reptiles of the West Indies: Descriptions, Distributions, and Natural History. Gainesville, Florida: University of Florida Press. 720 pp. . (Sphaerodactylus thompsoni, p. 539).

Sphaerodactylus
Endemic fauna of Hispaniola
Reptiles described in 1976